Tell Tale Hearts is a BBC Scotland television serial drama, written by Stephen Lowe, which stars Bill Paterson and was directed by Thaddeus O'Sullivan.

The three-part psychological thriller was broadcast  down on BBC1 on 1 November 1992. The serial was nominated twice in the 1993 BAFTA Scotland awards - for best drama serial and best television actor (Bill Paterson).

Plot
Anthony Steadman (Paterson) is a child-murderer set to begin a new life having been released from prison after seventeen years. Sally McCann, (Brid Brennan), a mother whose child disappeared around the time of the original murder, is pursuing Steadman to learn the truth about her missing child. Also on Steadman's trail is Becky Wilson (Emma Fielding), a local radio reporter, for whom the case brings back ghosts from her own past.

Cast
Anthony Steadman: : Bill Paterson
Becky Wilson: Emma Fielding
Sally McCann: Brid Brennan
Adrian Fell: Clive Russell
John Wilson: John Woodvine
Hilary Wilson: Morag Hood
Pete Akins: Benny Young
Mike McCann: Martin Cochrane
David Seilors: Doug Rayscott
Ex-Supt Walters: John Fraser
Mrs Walters: Lynne Christie
Revjeffrey Tiller: Michael David
Emma Johnson: Vari Sylvester
Sam: Joseph Brady
Eddie: Alastair Galbraith
Rick Peters: John Straiton
Maureen: Carol Ann Crawford

Production
Written By: Stephen LoweProducers: David Blair and Norman McCandlishDirector: Thaddeus O'Sullivan

References

BBC Scotland television shows
1992 Scottish television series debuts
1990s Scottish television series
1992 Scottish television series endings